John Pitts may refer to:

John Pitts (Catholic scholar) (1560–1616), English Catholic
John Pitts (merchant) (born 1688) a  Massachusetts merchant, who was born in England 
John W Pitts, US inventor of the 1928 Pitts Sky Car.
John E. Pitts, Jr. (1924–1977), United States Air Force officer
John Pitts (American football) (born 1945), former American football defensive back
John Pitts (composer), British composer

See also 
John Pitt (disambiguation)